Hapsiceraurus is a genus of trilobites in the order Phacopida (family Cheiruridae) that existed during the upper Ordovician in what is now Canada. It was described by Whittington in 1954, and the type species is Hapsiceraurus hispidus (type specimen: USNM 28169a). The type locality was on Baffin Island, in Nunavut.

References

External links
 Hapsiceraurus at the Paleobiology Database

Cheiruridae
Phacopida genera
Fossil taxa described in 1954
Ordovician trilobites
Extinct animals of Canada